Liannan Yao Autonomous County (postal: Linnam) is located in the north of Guangdong province, China, and is part of Qingyuan prefecture-level city. More than half the population of the county is part of the Yao people.

Climate

See also
 Autonomous entities of China

References 

County-level divisions of Guangdong
Yao autonomous counties
Qingyuan